The Superintendent of the Los Angeles Unified School District is the chief administrative officer of the District selected by the District's Board of Education. Portuguese-American educator and former superintendent of Miami-Dade County Public Schools, Alberto M. Carvalho, is been serving as the District's superintendent since February 14, 2022.

History 

With the first ordinance of establishing public schools passed by the Los Angeles Common Council in 1853, the ordinance stated that out of three appointed members of the Board of Education the chairman would act as Superintendent of Public Schools. The first officeholder was Joseph Lancaster Brent, who served until 1854. That year, Mayor Stephen C. Foster was chosen by the other Board members and urged the need for improvements in the system.  From 1853 to 1866, the superintendent was appointed by the Common Council. From 1866 to 1870, the office was elected via popular vote before being discontinued as the office did not have power nor authority to enforce decrees.

In 1872, the Common Council created the City Board of Education, which would have the power to appoint a superintendent, thieir first appointment being Dr. William T. Lucky in 1873. The first female superintendent was appointed in 1880, when Chloe B. Jones took office. The second female superintendent would be Susan Miller Dorsey, appointed in 1919 and the longest serving with 10 years. In 1961, the Los Angeles City School District and the Los Angeles City High School District merged to create the Los Angeles Unified School District, to which its first superintendent of all school in the district was Jack P. Crowther who fought cutbacks to the district.

In 2005 after his election, Mayor Antonio Villaraigosa attempted to gain control of the Los Angeles Unified School District as one of his top priorities. He did so with the passing of AB 1381 through the California State Legislature, which would remove the power from the Board of Education and give it to the superintendent who would be picked by a council made by mayors of the cities in LAUSD. The law was signed by Governor Arnold Schwarzenegger in 2006 before being struck down as unconstitutional in 2007. The first African-American superintendent would be Sidney A. Thompson in 1992, followed by David L. Brewer III in 2006. The first female Africa-American and first female superintendent in over 80 years would be Michelle King in 2016.

Duties and powers 

The superintendent is the chief administrative officer of the District and serves as the responsible local agency, able to delegate appropriate authority and responsibility to the Deputy Superintendent of Instruction with the direction of the Board of Education as well as able to supervise the Chief Special Education Officer and local district superintendents. The superintendent could gain special powers if the Board of Education declares an emergency; one of these times it was utilized was during the COVID-19 pandemic in California, when superintendent Austin Beutner used it to make fast-track deals.

Succession 
If an superintendent decides to step down from their post, the Board of Education approves a superintendent selection timeline for the district to find the next superintendent. During this time, an interim superintendent is appointed to serve as the head. After community and stakeholder input, the recruitment begins . After an interview process, a permanent superintendent is selected and their contract is finalized and approved by the Board of Education.

List of superintendents 

City Superintendent of Common Schools

Superintendent of Los Angeles City Schools

Superintendent of the Los Angeles Unified School District

References 

Los Angeles Unified School District
Los Angeles Unified School District superintendents